Elmer H. Ripley (July 21, 1891 – April 29, 1982) was an American basketball coach.   He coached college basketball at seven different schools and for several professional teams.

Early life
Ripley was born in Staten Island, New York on July 21, 1891. After graduating from local Curtis High School, he attended Brown University.

Playing career
Ripley began his career as a player before making the switch to coach in 1922. At age 19, Ripley decided to leave Brown to play basketball professionally with the Interstate League Brooklyn Trolly Dodgers, the New York League's Utica Utes and the "Original Celtics" club. Ripley would enjoy numerous achievements including being voted among the ten best pro players from 1909 to 1926.

Coaching career
After playing, he went on to coach basketball at several major American universities and traveled the world teaching the game. Ripley began his first professional coaching tenure with Wagner College in 1922, before moving into a position at Georgetown University in 1927.  He won 12 of his first 13 games.  During his many years with the Georgetown, he achieved a 133–82 record and lead the Hoyas to the NCAA tournament in 1943, reaching the national championship game.  Ripley was hired away by several colleges including Columbia University, University of Notre Dame, and Yale University, which he coached to the 1933 Ivy League championship.

After leaving Georgetown in 1949, Ripley coached the Harlem Globetrotters (1953–1956), the Israeli Olympic team (1956) and the Canadian Olympic team (1960).  The U.S. Committee for Sports sent Ripley to Israel in 1957 to teach basketball.  In 1962, Ripley coached high school basketball for the Englewood (N.J.)School for Boys (later part of the Dwight-Englewood School).  In 1965-66, while coaching at Englewood, Ripley was hired by the New York Knicks to teach their center, future Hall of Famer Willis Reed, how to play the power forward position when the Knicks acquired a second center, future Hall of Famer Walt Bellamy, for their team.  Ripley continued to coach through his 80th birthday and was inducted into the Naismith Memorial Basketball Hall of Fame in 1973.

Ripley died on April 29, 1982 at the age of 90.

Head coaching record

College

See also
 List of NCAA Division I Men's Final Four appearances by coach

References

External links
 

1891 births
1982 deaths
American expatriate basketball people in Israel
American men's basketball coaches
American men's basketball players
Army Black Knights men's basketball coaches
Basketball coaches from New York (state)
Basketball players from New York City
Brown Bears men's basketball players
College men's basketball head coaches in the United States
Columbia Lions men's basketball coaches
Curtis High School alumni
Georgetown Hoyas men's basketball coaches
John Carroll Blue Streaks men's basketball coaches
Naismith Memorial Basketball Hall of Fame inductees
Notre Dame Fighting Irish men's basketball coaches
Original Celtics players
Sportspeople from Staten Island
Wagner Seahawks men's basketball coaches
Yale Bulldogs men's basketball coaches